In chemistry, after nonmetallic elements such as silicon, chlorine, and helium are classed as either metalloids, halogens, or noble gases, the remaining unclassified elements are hydrogen, carbon, nitrogen, oxygen, phosphorus, sulfur and selenium.

The nonmetallic elements are sometimes instead divided into two to six (or seven) alternative classes or sets according to, for example, electronegativity; the relative homogeneity of the halogens; molecular structure; the peculiar nature of hydrogen; the corrosive nature of oxygen and the halogens; their respective groups; and variations thereupon.

Classification science
Classes provided an economy of description and are beneficial to structuring knowledge and understanding of science. The distinction between classes is not absolute. Boundary overlaps can occur as outlying elements in each class show or begin to show less-distinct, hybrid-like, or atypical properties. As expressed by Nelson:
"…care needs to be taken to remember that…[this classification scheme] is only an approximation, and can only be used as a rough guide to the properties of the elements. Provided that this is done, however, it constitutes a very useful classification, and although purists often despise it because of its approximate nature, the fact is that practising chemists make a great deal of use of it, if only subconsciously, in thinking of the chemistry of different elements."

Two classes

Rudakiya. The nonmetals are simply classified according to their inclination to form chemical compounds. The halogens are not distinguished.

Three classes

Wulfsberg. The nonmetals are divided based on a loose correlation between electronegativity and oxidizing power. Very electronegative nonmetals have electronegativity values over 2.8; electronegative nonmetals have values of 1.9 to 2.8.

Bettelheim et al. The nonmetals are distinguished based on the molecular structures of their most thermodynamically stable forms in ambient conditions. Polyatomic nonmetals form structures or molecules in which each atom has two or three nearest neighbours (carbon: Cx; phosphorus: P4; sulfur: S8; selenium: Sex); diatomic nonmetals form molecules in which each atom has one nearest neighbour (hydrogen: H2; nitrogen: N2; oxygen: O2; fluorine: F2; chlorine: Cl2; bromine: Br2; iodine: I2); and the monatomic noble gases exist as isolated atoms (helium, neon, argon, krypton, xenon, radon) with no fixed nearest neighbour. This gradual reduction in the number of nearest neighbours corresponds (approximately) to a reduction in metallic character. A similar progression is seem among the metals. Metallic bonding tends to involve close-packed centrosymmetric structures with a high number of nearest neighbours. Post-transition metals and metalloids, sandwiched between the true metals and the nonmetals, tend to have more complex structures with an intermediate number of nearest neighbours

Four classes

Field & Gray. Hydrogen is placed by itself on account of it being "so different from all other elements". The remaining nonmetals are divided into nonmetals, halogens, and noble gases, with the unnamed class being distinguished by including nonmetals with relatively strong interatomic bonding, and the metalloids being effectively treated as a third super-class alongside metals and nonmetals.

Dinwiddle. A variant of Field & Gray in which carbon, nitrogen, oxygen, phosphorus, sulfur, and selenium are classified as carbon and other nonmetals.

Vernon. The nonmetals are divided into four classes that complement a four-fold division of the metals, with the noble metals treated as a subset of the transition metals. The metalloids are treated as chemically weak nonmetals, in a manner analogous to their chemically weak frontier metal counterparts.

Five classes

Dupasquier. Noble gases were not known in 1844 when this classification arrangement was published. Hydrogen, carbon, nitrogen and oxygen were grouped together on account of their occurrence in living things. Phosphorus, sulfur and selenium were characterised as being solid; volatile at an average temperature between 100 degrees and red heat; and combustible and flammable.

Myers et al. Metalloids are labeled as semiconductors and carbon, nitrogen, oxygen, phosphorus, sulfur, selenium as other nonmetals.

Dingle. Hydrogen is again placed by itself on account of its uniqueness. The remaining nonmetals are divided into metalloids, nonmetals, (referred to as "quintessential nonmetals"), halogens, and noble gases. Since the metalloids abut the post-transition or "poor" metals, they might be renamed as "poor non-metals".

Six or seven classes

Generic. After the relevant nonmetals are classified as either noble gases or halogens, the remainder are considered on a group-by-group basis. This results in six or seven sets of nonmetals, depending on the treatment of boron, which in some cases is regarded as a metalloid. The size of the group 14 set, and the sets of nonmetal pnictogens, chalcogens, and halogens will vary depending on how silicon, germanium, arsenic, antimony, selenium, tellurium, and astatine are treated. In some cases, the 2p nonmetals carbon, nitrogen, and oxygen, and other nonmetals are considered sufficiently different from their heavier congeners to warrant separate treatments.

Notes

References

Citations

Bibliography
Berkowitz J 2012, The stardust revolution: The new story of our origin in the stars, Prometheus Books, Amherst, New York, 
Bettelheim FA, Brown WH, Campbell MK, Farrell SO 2010, Introduction to general, organic, and biochemistry, 9th ed., Brooks/Cole, Belmont California, 
Catling DC 2013, Astrobiology: A very short introduction, Oxford University Press, Oxford, 
Challoner J 2014, The elements: The new guide to the building blocks of our universe, Carlton Publishing Group, 
Crawford FH 1968, Introduction to the science of physics, Harcourt, Brace & World, New York
Cressey 2010, "Chemists re-define hydrogen bond", Nature newsblog, accessed 23 August 2017
Cronyn MW 2003, "The prope
Dingle A 2017, The elements: An encyclopedic tour of the periodic table, Quad Books, Brighton, 
Dinwiddle R, Lamb H, Franceschetti DR & Viney M (eds) 2018, How science works, Dorling Kindersley, London
Dupasquier A 1844, Traité élémentaire de chimie industrielle, Charles Savy Juene, Lyon
Field SQ & Gray T 2011, Theodore Gray's elements vault, Black Dog & Leventhal Publishers, New York, 
Gargaud M, Barbier B, Martin H & Reisse J (eds) 2006, Lectures in astrobiology, vol. 1, part 1: The early Earth and other cosmic habitats for life, Springer, Berlin, 
Government of Canada 2015, Periodic table of the elements, accessed 30 August 2015
Ivanenko NB, Ganeev AA, Solovyev ND & Moskvin LN 2011, "Determination of trace elements in biological fluids", Journal of Analytical Chemistry, vol. 66, no. 9, pp. 784–799 (784), 
Jones BW 2010, Pluto: Sentinel of the Outer Solar System, Cambridge University, Cambridge, 
Jorgensen CK 2012, Oxidation numbers and oxidation states, Springer-Verlag, Berlin, 
 
Myers RT, Oldham KB & Tocci S 2004, Holt Chemistry, teacher ed., Holt, Rinehart & Winston, Orlando, 
Nelson PG 2011, Introduction to Inorganic Chemistry: Key Ideas and their Experimental Basis, Ventus Publishing ApS
Rudakiya DM & Patel Y, "Bioremediation of metals, metalloids, and nonmetals", in Panpatte DG & Jhala YK (eds), in Microbial Rejuvenation of Polluted Environment, vol. 2, Springer Nature, Singapore, pp. 33–50, 
Vernon RE 2020, "Organising the metals and nonmetals," Foundations of Chemistry, pp. 1−17,  (open access)
Wang et al. 2020, "Understanding the uniqueness of the 2p-elements in the Periodic Table," Chemistry - A European Journal, vol. 26, no. 67, 
 

Metalloids
Halogens
Noble gases